Jimmy Quilty (born 2002) is an Irish hurler. At club level he plays with Blackrock, while he is also a member of the Limerick senior hurling team. He usually lines out as a forward.

Career

Quilty first played hurling at juvenile and underage levels with the Blackrock club, before progressing to adult level. He first appeared at inter-county level with Limerick as a member of the minor team that won the Munster MHC title in 2019. Quilty later spent three consecutive seasons with the under-20 team and was team captain when Limerick were beaten by Kilkenny in the 2022 All-Ireland under-20 final. He was also drafted onto the senior team that year and was part of the extended panel when Limerick won that year's All-Ireland title. Quilty made his debut during the 2023 National League.

Career statistics

Honours

Limerick
All-Ireland Senior Hurling Championship: 2022
Munster Senior Hurling Championship: 2022
Munster Under-20 Hurling Championship: 2022
Munster Minor Hurling Championship: 2019

References

2002 births
Living people
Blackrock (Limerick) hurlers
Limerick inter-county hurlers